Bye Bye Blackbird is a 2005 Drama film directed by Robinson Savary and starring James Thiérrée, Derek Jacobi and Izabella Miko.

Plot 
Josef (James Thiérrée) is a former construction worker who now works as a sweeper at the circus, and falls for the aerialist, Alice (Izabella Miko) and is befriended by the horseback performer, Nina (Jodhi May). One day, he defies death and gravity by doing an aerial display on the trapeze. When he is spotted by the big top's owner, Lord Dempsey (Derek Jacobi), he is paired with Alice in a dangerous aerial display as part of a new act for the circus.
However, things turn tragic as an accident happens and Alice is declared dead, with the circus turned topsy turvy with the loss of their only profitable act and Josef going mad with grief, destroying the "White Angels" act.

Cast
 James Thiérrée ... Josef
 Derek Jacobi ... Lord Dempsey
 Izabella Miko ... Alice
 Jodhi May ... Nina
 Michael Lonsdale ... Robert
 Andrej Aćin ... Roberto
 Chris Bearne ... Lord Strathclyde
 Niklas Ek ... Djamako
 Claire Johnston ... Emma
 Carlos Pavlidis ... Jenkins
 Claudine Peters ... Miss Julia

Soundtrack
The soundtrack for the film, named Hello Blackbird, by the American alternative rock band Mercury Rev, was released in 2006.

References

External links

2005 films
Austrian crime drama films
German crime drama films
2005 crime drama films
English-language Austrian films
English-language German films
English-language Luxembourgian films
Luxembourgian drama films
British crime drama films
2000s English-language films
2000s British films
2000s German films